The Gulfport Tarpons were a minor league baseball team based in Gulfport, Mississippi. Gulfport teams played exclusively as members of the Class D level Cotton States League. The Gulfport "Crabs" teams played in the league from 1906 to 1908, with the Tarpons playing from 1926 to 1928. The Tarpons hosted home minor league games at the Fair Grounds.

History
Gulfport, Mississippi first hosted minor league baseball in 1906.  The Gulfport Crabs became members of the six–team Class D level Cotton States League. The Baton Rouge Cajuns , Jackson Senators, Meridian White Ribbons, Mobile Sea Gulls and Vicksburg Hill Billies joined Gulfport in 1906 league play.

On April 19, 1906, the Gulfport Crabs began league play in their first season of play. With a record of  58–61, Gulfport placed 4th in the six–team league. Laurel finished 16.5 games behind the Mobile Sea Gulls in the final standings, there were no playoffs. They were managed by Eric Miller, John Bolin and Link Stickney.

The 1907 season saw The Cotton League return to play as a six–team Class D league. The Gulfport Crabs ended the 1908 Cotton States League season schedule with a record of 68–67, placing 4th in the final standings. Managed by Bob Gilks, the Crabs finished 14.5 games behind the 1st place Mobile Sea Gulls in the final standings, as the league had no playoffs. Pitcher Jack Ryan of Gulfport led the Cotton States League with 220 strikeouts. Ryan would later manage the team.

The 1908 team became the Gulfport-Biloxi Sand Crabs in partnership with nearby Biloxi, Mississippi. The Gulfport-Biloxi Sand Crabs placed 3rd in the Cotton States League final standings. Gulfport-Biloxi had a regular season record of 63–52 and finished 7.5 games behind the 1st place Jackson Senators in the six–team league. Following the 1908 season, the Cotton States League did not play in 1909 and returned to play in 1910 without a Gulfport franchise.

Minor league baseball returned to Gulfport in 1926. Reportedly, the Gulfport franchise resumed play when a group of local businessmen bought the Cotton States League's Brookhaven Truckers franchise and moved the team to Gulfport, Mississippi.

The 1926 Gulfport "Tarpons" resumed play in the Cotton States League. The Gulfport Tarpons became members of the eight–team Class D level Cotton States League. The Alexandria Reds, Hattiesburg Pinetoppers, Jackson Red Sox, Laurel Lumberjacks, Meridian Mets, Monroe Drillers and Vicksburg Hill Billies joined Laurel in league play. Gulfport ended the 1926 season with a record of 57–66 to place 6th in the league standings, playing under managers Cotton Knaupp and Jack Ryan, a former player for the franchise. The Tarpons finished 16.5 games behind the 1st place Hattiesburg Pinetoppers in the final Cotton States League final standings.

With a record of 57–64, the 1927 Gulfport Tarpons placed 5th in the Cotton States League standings. Playing under manager Joe Evans, the Tarpons finished 29.0 games behind the 1st place Jackson Red Sox in the final standings and did not qualify for the playoffs.

In their final season of play, The Gulfport Tarpons continued play in the 1928 Cotton States League, and finished last. Gulfport finished the regular season with a 50–65 overall record to place 6th in the league, which had two halves. Managed by the returning Cotton Knaupp, Gulfport finished 33.0 games behind the 1st place Jackson Red Sox in the final overall standings.

Gulfport, Mississippi has not hosted another minor league team.

The ballparks
The Gulfport Tarpons hosted minor league home games at the Gulfport Fair Grounds from 1926 to 1928. The ballpark location was referenced to have been within the Gulfport Fairgrounds. Today, the Harrison County Fairgrounds are still in use, located at 15321 County Farm Road, Gulfport, Mississippi.

The 1908 Gulfport-Biloxi Sand Crabs played some home games in Biloxi, Mississippi.

From 1913 to 1915, the Detroit Tigers hosted spring training at a location in Gulfport, Mississippi.

Timeline

Year–by–year record

Notable alumni

Joe Berry (1927–1928)
Jumbo Brown (1927)
Orth Collins (1906)
Spud Davis (1926)
Joe Evans (1927, MGR)
Don Flinn (1926)
Tom Gettinger (1908)
Bob Gilks (1907–1908, MGR)
Art Goodwin (1907)
Cotton Knaupp (1926, 1928, MGR)
Jack Lively (1906–1908)
Joe Price (1926–1927)
Tom Reilly (1907–1908)
Jack Ryan (1906–1907), (1926, MGR)
Pete Susko (1926)
Dixie Walker (1928) 5x MLB All–Star

See also
Gulfport Crabs playersGulfport Tarpons playersGulfport-Biloxi Sand Crabs players

References

External links
 Baseball Reference

Defunct minor league baseball teams
Defunct baseball teams in Mississippi
Cotton States league
Baseball teams established in 1926
Baseball teams disestablished in 1928
Cotton States League teams
Gulfport, Mississippi
1926 establishments in Mississippi
1928 disestablishments in Mississippi